Piz da la Crappa (3,122 m) is a mountain in the Sesvenna Range of the Alps, located west of S-charl in the canton of Graubünden. Its summit is the tripoint between the Val Plavna, the Val Zuort and the Val S-charl.

The east side of the mountain is part of the Swiss National Park.

References

External links
 Piz da la Crappa on Hikr

Mountains of Switzerland
Mountains of Graubünden
Mountains of the Alps
Alpine three-thousanders